Mister Asylum is the debut album by American rock band Highly Suspect, released on July 17, 2015. It features the singles "Lydia" and "Bloodfeather".

Reception
The album debuted  at No. 56 on Billboard 200, and No. 7 on the Top Rock Albums chart, selling 4,000 copies in its first week. It has sold 58,000 copies as of November 2016.

Timothy Monger at AllMusic reflected positively on the album, likening its "muscular" sound to Kings of Leon and Queens of the Stone Age.

Track listing

Personnel
 Ryan Meyer - drums, vocals 
 Rich Meyer - bass, vocals 
 Johnny Stevens – guitar, vocals, synthesizer
 Sasha Dobson - backing vocals on "23"

Charts

References

2015 debut albums
Highly Suspect albums